Pine Island may refer to:

Islands

Australia 
Pine Island Reserve, Australian Capital Territory

Canada 
Pine Island (Carp Lake, British Columbia), a small island in central British Columbia
Pine Island (Ontario)
Pine Island (Queen Charlotte Strait, British Columbia), a small island off northern Vancouver Island
Pine Island Fort, an historic trading post on Pine Island, Saskatchewan, about 50 km east of Lloydminster

New Caledonia 
Pine Island (New Caledonia), also known as Isle of Pines

Spain 
 Pine Islands, an alternate common (but informal) name for the Pityusic Islands, comprising the two main islands of Ibiza and Formentera and their surrounding islets

United States 
Pine Island (Lee County, Florida)
Pine Island Sound, Lee County, Florida
Pine Island National Wildlife Refuge
 Pine Island (Montana), an island in the Missouri River
Pine Island (New Rochelle), in Westchester County, New York
Pine Island (Lake Livingston), Texas

Towns
Pine Island, Florida (disambiguation), multiple places
Pine Island Center, Florida, in Lee County
Pine Island Ridge, Florida, in Broward county
Pine Island, Minnesota, a small city in Goodhue County
Pine Island Township, Goodhue County, Minnesota near Pine Island
Pine Island, New York
Pine Island, South Carolina
Pine Island, Texas

Other
Pine Island (horse) (2003–2006), American thoroughbred racehorse
Pine Island Bay, Antarctica
Pine Island Bridge on the Carolina Southern Railroad near Myrtle Beach, South Carolina, United States
Pine Island Glacier, Antarctica
USS Pine Island (AV-12), US Navy ship from World War II